The 2015–16 Rutgers Scarlet Knights men's basketball team represented Rutgers University–New Brunswick during the 2015–16 NCAA Division I men's basketball season. The Scarlet Knights, led by third year head coach Eddie Jordan, played their home games at the Louis Brown Athletic Center as second year members of the Big Ten Conference. They finished the season 7–25, 1–17 in Big Ten play to finishing in last place. They lost in the first round of the Big Ten tournament to Nebraska.

Following the season, head coach Eddie Jordan was fired. He finished at Rutgers with a three-year record of 29–68.

Previous season
The Scarlet Knights finished the 2014-15 Season 10–22, 2–16 in Big Ten play to finish in last place. They lost in the first round of the Big Ten tournament to Minnesota.

Departures

Incoming transfers

2015 signing class

Roster

Schedule

|-
!colspan=9 style=| Non-conference regular season

|-
!colspan=9 style=|Big Ten regular season

|-
!colspan=9 style=| Big Ten Conference tournament

See also
2015–16 Rutgers Scarlet Knights women's basketball team

References

Rutgers Scarlet Knights men's basketball seasons
Rutgers
2015 in sports in New Jersey
2016 in sports in New Jersey